The Bojayá massacre was a massacre that occurred on May 2, 2002 in the town of Bellavista, Bojayá Municipality, Chocó Department, Colombia. Revolutionary Armed Forces of Colombia (FARC) guerrillas attacked the town in an attempt to take control of the Atrato River region from United Self-Defense Forces of Colombia (AUC) paramilitaries. During the fighting, a cylinder bomb (known in Spanish as a pipeta or cilindro bomba) launched by the FARC with a mortar at the AUC paramilitaries positioned by the walls of a church, went through the roof of the church instead, landing on the altar inside. Of the approximately 300 inhabitants of the town who had taken refuge in the church, 119 died in the explosion.

Background
The Colombian government had described the area as subject to "the armed confrontation in the region between the guerrillas and the illegal self-defence forces is very violent due to the economic and strategic interests in play, including, among others: drug trafficking, the inter-oceanic connection, the development of megaprojects like the Panamerican Highway, and the proximity of ports and hydroelectric stations. The region furthermore represents advantages for these groups as a route for the import of arms and supplies from Central America and to provide favourable routes for drug trafficking."

Preceding events
At least 250 paramilitary combatants moved in to Bellavista, the administrative centre of the municipality of Bojayá, on 21 April 2002. They remained there despite protests by local residents. The UNHCHR sent an official communication to the Colombian government on April 23 expressing their concern regarding the presence of the paramilitaries and the possible consequences for the local people. The Ombudsman's Office of Colombia also visited the region on April 26 and released an early warning regarding the threat of  an armed confrontation in the area.

Intense fighting broke out on May 1 in neighboring town Vigía del Fuerte and spread to Bellavista later in the day. Around 300 residents took shelter in the local church, 100 in the adjoining parsonage, and another 100 in the Augustinian Missionary residence, over the course of the night.

Details of the attack
According to the official UN investigation report, in the morning of May 2 the AUC paramilitaries had established positions around the church, using the rare concrete buildings and the cement wall around the church yard for protection. The FARC took up positions to the north (in Barrio Pueblo Nuevo), and began launching gas cylinder bombs (pipetas) toward the paramilitary positions. Two of the bombs landed nearby and the third went through the roof of the church, where it exploded on the altar.

The UN investigation found the FARC in violation of several principles of international humanitarian law, including an indiscriminate attack causing unnecessary civilian casualties, failure to distinguish between civilian and combatant, failure to take efforts to protect civilians from avoidable harm, and attacks against cultural property. Prohibitions against these acts are found in Common Article 3 of the 1949 Geneva Conventions and Articles 4, 13, and 16 of Additional Protocol II. The UN also considered the FARC responsible for the forced displacement of civilians generated as a consequence of the attack on the church, placing the act in violation of Article 17 of Protocol II.

The UN found the AUC to be in violation of various aspects of international humanitarian law, including using civilians as human shields, failing to protect civilians from the effects of their military operations, and for causing massive forced displacement of civilian populations in the region due to their acts, threats and combat operations in the area. Given reports of theft by the AUC of goods, equipment and vehicles belonging to local residents, the UN also found the AUC guilty of pillage (a violation of Article 17 of Protocol II).

The UNHCHR additionally found that the Colombian government failed to act, in order to prevent the massive human suffering which ensued  from the events in Bojaya; suffering that was predicted and of which the government was explicitly warned of beforehand.

Responsibility of the state
The First Administrative Court of Quibdo, Chocó sentenced the Colombian State to a billion and a half Colombian peso compensation to relatives of two of the dead victims on May 29, 2008. It ruled the State was administratively responsible and had neglected to protect its citizens, despite the warnings of the ombudsman.

Death of perpetrator
At dawn of 22 February 2012, nearly 10 years after the event, a Colombian Air Force EMB-314 aircraft identified the camp of FARC's 57th Front, 15 kilometers north of Bojayá near the border with Panama. The Super Tucano dropped two high-precision bombs, destroying the camp and killing six FARC rebels (including Pedro Alfonso Alvarado a.k.a. “Mapanao"), who are believed to have been responsible for the massacre.

See also
 List of massacres in Colombia

Notes

Conflicts in 2002
Massacres in Colombia
Spree shootings in Colombia
Mass murder in 2002
Political repression in Colombia
Massacres committed by FARC
Colombian conflict
May 2002 events in South America
2002 murders in Colombia
Massacres in 2002